Stalvira Stepanovna Orshush (born 22 April 1993 in Ulan-Ude, Buryatia) is a Russian freestyle wrestler of  Hungarian heritage. Orshush began competing in wrestling in 2011 and since then, she has won various medals at many tournaments. Orshush came in second place and won the silver medal at the 2016 National Championships.

In 2017, Orshush obtained a better result winning the gold medal and taking the first place, making Orshush a part of the Russian national team. She won the silver medal at the Ivan Yarygin 2018 Golden Grand Prix, held in Krasnoyarsk.

In 2018 Orshush won the gold medal in the 55 kg category at the 2018 Klippan Lady Open.

Her biggest achievement was winning the gold medal at the 2018 European Wrestling Championships by defeating the two-world champion Vanesa Kaladzinskaya of Belarus by fall in the final.  Orshush became a two-time Russian national champion in 2018, by defeating Kuular of Kemerovo by 11-0 technical fall.

In March 2021, she competed at the European Qualification Tournament in Budapest, Hungary hoping to qualify for the 2020 Summer Olympics in Tokyo, Japan.

She is of Magyar descent.

References

External links
 Profile at wrestrus.ru
 

1993 births
Living people
Russian female sport wrestlers
Olympic wrestlers of Russia
People from Ulan-Ude
European Games bronze medalists for Russia
Wrestlers at the 2019 European Games
European Games medalists in wrestling
Russian people of Hungarian descent
Wrestlers at the 2020 Summer Olympics
European Wrestling Champions
Sportspeople from Buryatia
21st-century Russian women